The 1837 Connecticut gubernatorial election was held on April 3, 1837. Incumbent governor and Democratic nominee Henry W. Edwards was re-elected, defeating former congressman and Whig nominee William W. Ellsworth with 52.53% of the vote.

General election

Candidates
Major party candidates

Henry W. Edwards, Democratic
William W. Ellsworth, Whig

Results

References

1837
Connecticut
Gubernatorial